Ataur Rahman Khan is a Bangladesh Nationalist Party politician and the former Member of Parliament of Kishoreganj-3.

Career
Khan was elected to parliament from Kishoreganj-3 as a Bangladesh Nationalist Party candidate in 2001.Khan was a top member of Harkat-ul-Jihad-al-Islami Bangladesh. In 1988, he, on a tour with senior leaders of Harkat-ul-Jihad-al-Islami Bangladesh, visited Afghanistan and met with Osama bin Laden.

References

Bangladesh Nationalist Party politicians
Living people
8th Jatiya Sangsad members
Bangladeshi Islamists
People from Kishoreganj District
20th-century births
20th-century Bengalis
21st-century Bengalis
Year of birth missing (living people)